The Chosen Pyeongan Railway (Japanese: 朝鮮平安鉄道株式會社, Chōsen Heian Tetsudō Kabushiki Kaisha; Korean: 조선평안철도주식회사, Joseon Pyeongan Cheoldo Jusikhoesa), was a privately owned railway company in Japanese-occupied Korea.

History
On 8 July 1938, the Chosen Pyeongan Railway opened the  Oncheon Line from Jinnampo, terminus of the Chosen Government Railway's Pyeongnam Line, to Yonggang Oncheon, running passenger trains to serve the hot springs there.

After the partition of Korea the line was within the territory of the DPRK, and was nationalised by the Provisional People’s Committee for North Korea along with all other railways in the Soviet zone of occupation on 10 August 1946, to be operated by the Korean State Railway, which merged the Oncheon Line into the Pyeongnam Line.

Services
Two trains stopping at every station were listed in the 1945 timetable, one from Botonggang Station in suburban Pyongyang, and the other from Deokcheon on the West Chosen Central Railway's Seoseon Line. The reason for needing a train connecting these two cities is unclear. However, the train left Deokcheon at 3:12 PM, arriving at Oncheon at 2:45 AM the next morning; then, it departed Oncheon at 4:05 AM, arriving at Botonggang at 8:55 AM before returning to Oncheon and thence to Deokcheon.

Route

References

Rail transport in North Korea
Rail transport in Korea
Defunct railway companies of Korea
Korea under Japanese rule
Defunct companies of Japan